Prisoner of the Volga is a 1959 adventure film starring John Derek. He plays an officer in the time of the Tsar who is sentenced to Siberia.

Plot

Cast

 John Derek: Alexis Orloff
 Elsa Martinelli: Masha
 Dawn Addams: Tatiana
 Wolfgang Preiss: Ossip
 Gert Fröbe: Professor 
 Charles Vanel: General Gorew
 Rik Battaglia: Lisekno
 Nerio Bernardi: Elagin
 Nino Marchetti: Michailow
 Arturo Bragaglia; the Prince
 Jacques Castelot: Jakowiew
 Feodor Chaliapin, Jr.: Fomitsch

References

External links

1959 films
Italian adventure films
French adventure films
Films set in Russia
Films set in the 19th century
Films directed by Victor Tourjansky
English-language French films
English-language Italian films
English-language Yugoslav films
Yugoslav adventure films
1959 adventure films
Films scored by Norbert Glanzberg
1950s English-language films
1950s Italian films
1950s French films